Wazemmes is a former commune in the Nord department in northern France, merged into Lille in 1858.

It is a cosmopolitan neighborhood, with a significant population of Chinese immigrants.

Heraldry

See also
Communes of the Nord department

Lille
Former communes of Nord (French department)